Declared historic buildings of Hangzhou are districts, artifacts or buildings legally declared to be "protected". According to the "Regulations of historic districts and historic buildings in Hangzhou" effective from 1 January 2005, historic buildings are those artifacts or districts that have lasted more than 50 years, and of significant values for history, science, and art study. In Hangzhou, declaring a historic house requires consulting the urban planning administration bureau, and the real estate administration bureau.

As of 31 June 2011, there are 287 declared historic buildings in Hangzhou, proclaimed as 5 batches.[17] In the near future, it is going to issue the sixth batch which includes 51 historic houses.

List of third batch of declared historic buildings in Hangzhou
70 buildings were declared to be the third batch of historic houses in Hang Zhou, in March 2007. The following information is provided by Real Estate Administration Bureau & Research Institute for Historic buildings in  Hangzhou.

References: 

Buildings and structures in Hangzhou